The 1913 Furman Baptists football team represented Furman University as an independent during the 1913 college football season. Led by Cuppy Farmer in his first and only season as head coach, Furman compiled a record of 6–3.

Schedule

References

Furman
Furman Paladins football seasons
Furman Baptists football